Smadar Rosensweig (Smadar Eliach) is an adjunct assistant professor of Bible at Yeshiva University's Stern College for Women. Prior to that she served as lecturer of Judaic studies and history at Touro College.

Smadar Rosensweig received her B.A. from Barnard College and M.A. from Azrielli (Yeshiva University) Barnard College. She delivers shiurim and lectures extensively throughout the New York metropolitan area.

She is the daughter of Rabbi David Eliach and Dr. Yaffa Eliach, Holocaust scholar and professor emeritus at Brooklyn College.

References

http://www.yu.edu/speakers/speaker.aspx?id=1299818422625200925158PM
http://www.yutorah.org/browse/browse.cfm#speaker=80147&lang=cfm&organizationID=301

External links
 YU Torah Online
 Yeshiva University Speakers Bureau

Living people
American theologians
Year of birth missing (living people)